Delonix boiviniana is a species of plant in the family Fabaceae. It is found only in Madagascar.

References

boiviniana
Endemic flora of Madagascar
Taxonomy articles created by Polbot
Taxa named by Henri Ernest Baillon
Taxa named by René Paul Raymond Capuron